Faustina Oware-Gyekye is a Ghanaian nurse leader who has taught at Mountcrest University College and the University of Ghana.

She was the president of the Ghana chapter of the West African College of Nursing and has edited several nursing journals.

Early life and education 
Oware-Gyekye attended Wesley Girl's High School in Cape Coast and was trained in nursing at Nurses’ Training College, Kumasi, and in midwifery at the Midwifery Training College, Korle Bu.

She holds a diploma in nursing education, a bachelor's degree in nursing, and a master's degree in medical geography from the University of Ghana.

In 1999, she obtained a post-graduate certificate in leadership and management from Tufts University.

Career 
Oware-Gyekye taught at the Midwifery Training School, Korle-Bu between 1975 and 1987, and taught at the University of Ghana until 2008.

Between 2000 and 2008, she was a member of the Nurses and Midwives Governing Council of Ghana.

Most recently, Oware-Gyekye worked as a senior lecturer at Mountcrest University College, Accra and from 2019 to 2021 was the president of the Ghana chapter of the West African College of Nursing. She also worked as a sub-editor of the West African College of Nursing journal, served as a member of the editorial board of Ghanaian Nurse (journal).

Selected publications 

 Gans-Lartey, F., O'Brien, B. A., Oware-Gyekye, F., & Schopflocher, D. (2013). The relationship between the use of the partograph and birth outcomes at Korle-Bu teaching hospital. Midwifery, 29(5), 461–467.
 Oware-Gyekye, Faustina. "Pain management: The role of the Nurse." West African Journal of Nursing 19.1 (2008).

References 

Living people
Ghanaian nurses
University of Ghana alumni
Ghanaian women writers
Ghanaian women editors
Ghanaian academics
Year of birth missing (living people)